Rouwaida Attieh (born July 1, 1982) is a Syrian vocalist. Rouwaida was the first runner-up on the first season of Super Star, the pan-Arab import of "Pop Idol". Along with Lebanese contestant Melhem Zein, she was a favourite to win the contest, which was won by Jordanian contestant Diana Karazon. She was signed under AlAnoud Productions.

Biography
Rouwaida was born in Talkalakh, Syria. She is the daughter of Haydar and Najida Attieh. Her father was born and grew up in Tripoli, Lebanon where he studied and graduated from High School. He met Rouwaida's mother Najida when he moved to Egypt to specialize in law. The couple married and came back to Lebanon, where Najida was born.

From her early childhood, Rouwaida used to watch Umm Kulthum's concerts on TV and she learned "Enta 3omry" when she was five years old. Her father was fascinated by her talent and he encouraged her. She studied music and playing oud (an oriental musical instrument) and she was a member in many clubs for preserving the folklore of the Arabic songs.

In 2008, She signed with Alanoud Production which is managed by Anoud Maaliki and released her first album with the label “Essmani” which was distributed by Platinum Records. The album included the two hit singles “Shou Sahel El Hali”, “Hayati Melkite” and “Bala Hob”. 

Rouwaida has quickly risen to fame thanks to the sheer power of her voice, and her skill in using it. Her deep and expressive voice helps her excel in the classical Arabic tarab style and the Levantine dabke style. She has worked with countless Arab musical giants, such as Lebanese composer Imad Shamseddine (credited with most of Najwa Karam’s success), Lebanese legend Wadih El Safi, and Egyptian composer Salah El Sharnoubi (credited with much of Warda's later hits).
In 2003 Rouwaida participated in Super Star 1, she reached the finals and won the hearts of millions of the people in the Arab World.

References

1982 births
Living people
21st-century Syrian women singers
People from Homs
Idols (franchise) participants
Contestants from Arabic singing competitions
Singers who perform in Classical Arabic
Syrian people of Lebanese descent
Syrian film actresses
Syrian television actresses